Héctor David Martínez (born 21 January 1998) is a professional footballer who plays as a centre-back for River Plate, on loan from Defensa y Justicia. Born in Argentina, he represents the Paraguay national team.

Club career
Martínez's career started with River Plate, initially featuring for their youth system; notably at the 2016 U-20 Copa Libertadores, though only as an unused substitute on three occasions. He first appeared in River Plate's first-team under Marcelo Gallardo in October 2017, with the defender being chosen on the bench for an Argentine Primera División defeat away to Talleres. His professional debut arrived on 2 December 2018 during a fixture with Gimnasia y Esgrima.

In July 2019, Defensa y Justicia completed the loan signing of Martínez. Across the next twelve months, the centre-back made twenty league appearances and scored two goals; against Godoy Cruz and Patronato. He also made appearances in the Copa Argentina and Copa Libertadores. Defensa extended his loan in April 2020, prior to signing him permanently in the succeeding August.

International career
Born in Argentina, Martínez is of Paraguayan descent through his mother. Martínez represented the Argentina U17s at both the 2015 South American U-17 Championship and 2015 FIFA U-17 World Cup; winning six caps. He was called up to represent the senior Paraguay national team in June 2021. He debuted with Paraguay in a 3–1 2021 Copa América win over Bolivia on 14 June 2021.

Career statistics

International goals 
Scores and results list Paraguay's goal tally first.

References

External links

1998 births
Living people
Footballers from Buenos Aires
Citizens of Paraguay through descent
Paraguayan footballers
Paraguay international footballers
Argentine footballers
Argentina youth international footballers
Paraguayan people of Argentine descent
Sportspeople of Argentine descent
Argentine sportspeople of Paraguayan descent
Association football defenders
Argentine Primera División players
Club Atlético River Plate footballers
Defensa y Justicia footballers